Vuélveme a Querer may refer:

"Vuélveme a Querer" (Cristian Castro song), 1995
Vuélveme a querer (telenovela), 2009
"Vuélveme a Querer" (Thalía song), 2016